Pengjiang is a district of Jiangmen, Guangdong province, China.

Administrative divisions

References

County-level divisions of Guangdong
Jiangmen